Pecan Bayou is a  tributary of the Red River in Texas. It is located entirely in Red River County, flowing west to east in a course north of Clarksville.

See also
List of rivers of Texas

References

USGS Hydrologic Unit Map - State of Texas (1974)

Rivers of Texas
Tributaries of the Red River of the South
Rivers of Red River County, Texas